Death Comes at High Noon is a 1964 Danish crime film directed by Erik Balling and starring Poul Reichhardt.

Cast
Poul Reichhardt as Peter Sander
Helle Virkner as Eva Lindberg
Birgitte Federspiel as Merete Lindberg
Jan Priiskorn-Schmidt as John Lindberg
Morten Grunwald as Bertel Lindberg
Kirsten Søberg as Frk. Jørgensen
Karl Stegger as Overbetjent Duus Jensen
Pouel Kern as Overbetjent Hald
Gunnar Lauring as Doktor Lund
Gunnar Strømvad as Autoforhandler H. F. Kærgaard
Ebba Amfeldt as Fru Kærgaard
Kai Holm as Tømmerhandleren
Einar Nørby as Lastbilchauffør
Johannes Meyer as Dr. Joachim Lindberg

Production

Much of the film was shot in or around the country house Tågegården at Rågeleje. Some of the forest scenes were shot at Silkeborg.

References

External links

1964 films
1964 crime films
1960s Danish-language films
Danish black-and-white films
Danish crime films
Films directed by Erik Balling
Films with screenplays by Erik Balling